Torres Novas is a Portuguese municipality in the district of Santarém, in the Médio Tejo of the Centro region. The population of the municipality was approximately 36,717 (from the 2011 census), with the city of Torres Novas (seat of the municipality) has about 15,000 inhabitants in an area that encompasses .

History

Pre-Monarchy 
The earliest sign of human life in the Portuguese territory is the 400,000 year old skull discovered at the Cave of Aroeira in 2017.
 
The territory of Torres Novas was settled as early as the Paelothic in areas situated along the margins of the karstic network of the River Almonda, such as the grottos in Buraca da Moura, Buraca da Oliveira and Lapa da Bugalheira.

During the primordial period before Roman occupation, there were various villae that were populated in the region. Vila Cardílio, a Luso-Roman settlement was occupied in the first or second century A.D. In it, archaeologists discovered coloured mosaics, coins, sculptures and Latin inscriptions, where one was inscribed with felicitous remarks to the villa da torre (town of the tower), an expression associated with the plausible origin for the toponymy Torres Novas. Remains of Roman roads can be found north and south of Torres Novas, the latter is thought to be a part of the Olisipo-Bracara Augusta via.

Monarchy 
During the 12th century, the territory that was known as Turris began to develop into its actual limits, with the expulsion of the ruling Muslims by forces loyal to Afonso I of Portugal in 1148. The foundation of the municipality was attributed to the foral issued on 1 October 1190, by King Sancho.

While the first origins of the castle are currently unknown, it is known that Sancho I had ordered the construction of a fortification that was later destroyed during wars with Castille. Later, King Fernando would reconstruct the castle with the same aim as his predecessor. The most important features of the Castle date from this latter intervention.

During the Middle Ages, the territory grew demographically and economically, receiving a Carta de Feira (authorizing a fair for this market) in 1263.

The lands of Torres Novas passed into the possessions of Queen Isabel of Aragon in 1304 (who was transferred into her title by King Denis). In the following years, Torres Novas was a meeting point for sessions of the Cortes, and historical points in the kingdoms history, like the wedding between Infanta Beatriz and Infante Henrique, children of King Fernando I and King João I of Castilo (in 1380); the establishment of regency of Queen Leonor of Aragon Aragon (due to the death of King Edward I), during the reign of Afonso V (1438); and the decisions of the Cortes, which gathered intermittently in Torres Novas, to manage the Kingdom's issues (1525).

Isabel of Avis was the donatário at the first half of the 15th century, receiving a new foral, during the reign of Manuel I of Portugal (1510).

In the following decade, John of Lancaster was given the title of the first Marquis of Torres Novas, along with the Duke of Aveiro (which were both extinguished in 1759, following the attempted regicide of Joseph I, associated with José Mascarenhas da Silva e Lencastre). The monarch survived the attempted assassination.

In 1755, the Lisbon earthquake reached Torres Novas and destroyed four of the Castle's towers.

The king's daughter later conceded a license to Henrique Meuron and David Suabe to install Fábrica das Chitas (1783), which was later destroyed by General Massena, during the third French campaign along the Iberian peninsula (1810).

The economy within Torres Novas continued along the 19th century, with some successes and failures: the founding of the Fábrica de Papel do Almonda (1818); establishment of the Companhia de Fiação de Torres Novas (1845); the creation of the transporter João Clara & Companhia (Irmãos) Lda. which, at the time of its nationalization (1975), was dominated by Clara Transportes - S.A.R.L.. In 1835, Queen Maria I of Portugal would donate the Castle to Torres Nova's municipality, which would decide to demolish parts of the structure.

The inauguration of the rail link between Torres Novas and Alcanena occurred in 1893, and was one of the most curious episode in the business and troubled history of the area. It was shut down only three years after its inauguration, due to multiple derailments earned it the nickname "Blind rat".

In 1910, before the 5 October 1910 revolution, the Torres Novas castle received the status of National Monument.

Post-Monarchy 
Between 1940 and 1960 the Direção-Geral dos Edifícios e Monumentos Nacionais would order the reconstruction of part of the castle walls, including the towers.

In 1985, Torres Novas was elevated to the status of city.

On 1 January 1986, Portugal would join the European Economic Community, which would see to the construction of highway A23 leading to Spain. This development benefited Torres Novas, giving it a logistical advantage and pushing the development of business and shops between the Torres Novas city center and the A23 entry.

Geography

Physical geography 
The municipality of Torres Novas is situated in the Médio Tejo subregion. It has close regional relationships with Tomar, Abrantes, Entroncamento, Vila Nova da Barquinha, Alcanena and Ourém. The castle and old town developed partially encircled by the Almonda river, which constituted a natural line of defense. The soil is mostly characterized by alluviums and limestone.

Climate 
Torres Novas experiences a microclimate characterized by low temperature and humidity during the winter and dry air/higher temperatures during the summer due to its proximity with the mountain ranges of Aire and Candeeiros. Its annual rainfall tends to be between 600 and 800 and experiences 2400–2700 hours of direct sunlight exposure per year.

Civil Parishes 
Administratively, The city of Torres Novas is the seat of the municipality, that is divided into 10 civil parishes civil parishes:
 Assentiz
 Brogueira, Parceiros de Igreja e Alcorochel
 Chancelaria
 Meia Via
 Olaia e Paço
 Pedrógão
 Riachos
 Torres Novas (São Pedro), Lapas e Ribeira Branca
 Torres Novas (Santa Maria, Salvador e Santiago)
 Zibreira
Four of the parishes were included in the city of Torres Novas. The union of Torres Novas (São Pedro), Lapas e Ribeira Branca concentrates the majority of the people of the municipality (over 8400 inhabitants), in contrast with the parish of Zibreira (with approximately 1000 people). The small size means that it is the largest by density, with 395 inhabitants per kilometre square, and eight times the density of the smallest, Chancelaria.

Demographics 
According to the 2011 census, Torres Novas had a populational density of 136 people/km2 in 2011, above the national average of 114.5 people/km2, an aging index (ratio of people ≥65 to people ≤14) of 173.0, also above the national average of 127.8, and a sex ratio of 91.2, slightly below the national average of 91.5.

Archeology 

The village of Almonda within the parish of Zibreira is noted for the Aroeira cave where the 400,000 years old Aroeira 3 skull of Homo Heidelbergensis was discovered in 2014 - the oldest trace of human history in Portugal.

International Relations

Twin towns — Sister cities

Torres Novas is twinned with:

  Ribeira Grande, Cape Verde, since 1997
  Moreni, Romania
  Rambouillet, France, since 2010
  Manatuto, East Timor, since 2002

Politics 
The present president of the municipality is Pedro Ferreira, elected by the Socialist Party.

City hall

Economy
Renova – Fábrica de Papel do Almonda, SA, a well known paper company, is based in the municipality, as well as the Companhia de Torres Novas, a textiles company.

Culture
The municipal holiday is Ascension Day.

There are Municipal Museum Carlos Reis, Agricultural Museum of Riachos and Humberto Delgado Memorial House in the municipality.

Notable citizens 

 Sebastião de Sousa Dantas Baracho, (Wiki PT) (1844-1921) military man and politician during the end of the Portuguese Monarchy and part of the Constituent Assembly during the First Portuguese Republic.
 Carlos António Rodrigues dos Reis, (Wiki PT) (1863-1940) naturalistic painter.
 Maria Lamas (1893-1983) writer, translator, journalist, and feminist political activist.
 Manuel António Vassalo e Silva (1899-1985) officer of the Portuguese Army and an overseas administrator. He was the 128th and last Governor-General of Portuguese India.
 Humberto Delgado (1906-1965) General of the Portuguese Air Force, diplomat and politician.
 Maria Lúcia Vassalo Namorado (1909-2000) writer, poet, journalist, teacher and social reformer, and director of the magazine Os nossos filhos (Our Children).
 Carlos Cruz (born 1942) radio and TV journalist and talk-show host involved in the Casa Pia scandal.
 José Luís Borga (1964) Roman Catholic priest and Christian contemporary musician.

Sport 
 José Torres (1938 - 2010) football centre forward and coach with 374 club caps and 33 for Portugal
 Luís Fernando Quintas dos Santos (born 1965) known as Quintas, a former footballer with over 320 club caps.
 Jorge Casquilha (born 1969) a former footballer with 458 club caps
 Pedro Miguel Marques da Costa Filipe (born 1980) known as Pepa, a former footballer and current manager of Vitória S.C.

References
Notes

Sources

External links

 Flickr.com: Photos from Torres Novas

 
Cities in Portugal
Populated places in Santarém District
Municipalities of Santarém District